John Joseph Mackinson (October 29, 1923 – October 17, 1989) was an American professional baseball pitcher who appeared in ten games (nine as a pitcher) in the major leagues (MLB) for the  Philadelphia Athletics and  St. Louis Cardinals. His pro career lasted 13 seasons (1946–1958).

He served in the United States Army during World War II. He spent seven years in the New York Yankees' farm system before his acquisition by Philadelphia in 1953. In his only appearance in an Athletics' uniform, Mackinson threw 1 scoreless innings in relief against the Boston Red Sox on April 16, 1953; the only hit he surrendered was a single to future Baseball Hall of Famer George Kell.

Released by the Athletics' organization in May 1955, Mackinson was signed by the Cardinals and was recalled from Triple-A to pitch in eight games between August 17 and September 2. That stretch afforded Mackinson his only MLB decision (a defeat in relief at the hands of the Cincinnati Redlegs on August 20) and starting assignment (on August 25 against the Philadelphia Phillies; staked to a 4–0 lead in the top of the first inning, he couldn't get out of the bottom of the frame and exited after securing only one out). In his final big-league game on September 19, Mackinson pinch-ran for future Hall of Fame Stan Musial in the ninth inning of a tie game at Busch Stadium; he failed to score a run, but the Redbirds won in extra innings.

Mackinson returned to the minors in 1956 and played three more seasons. He died at age 65 in the Los Angeles suburb of Reseda on October 17, 1989.

References

External links

1923 births
1989 deaths
Baseball players from New Jersey
Beaumont Exporters players
Beaumont Roughnecks players
Binghamton Triplets players
Birmingham Barons players
Columbus Jets players
Industriales de Valencia players
Kansas City Blues (baseball) players
Major League Baseball pitchers
Muskegon Clippers players
Nashville Vols players
Navegantes del Magallanes players
American expatriate baseball players in Venezuela
Newark Bears (IL) players
Omaha Cardinals players
Ottawa A's players
People from Orange, New Jersey
Philadelphia Athletics players
Rochester Red Wings players
Sportspeople from Essex County, New Jersey
St. Louis Cardinals players
Sunbury Yankees players
Tulsa Oilers (baseball) players
United States Army personnel of World War II